Loth may refer to:

People

Given name
King Lot, figure in Arthurian legend
Loth Schout (1600–1655), Dutch brewer

Surname
Agnete Loth (1921–1990), editor and translator of Old Icelandic texts
Andreas Loth (born 1972), German ice hockey player
Ila Lóth (1900–1975), Hungarian film actress
Jan Loth (1900–1933), Polish footballer
Joe Loth (born 1967), American football coach
Johann Carl Loth (1632–1698), German Baroque painter
Joseph Loth (1847–1934), French linguist and historian
Moritz Loth (1832–1913), Moravian-American businessman
Wilfried Loth (born 1948), German historian and political scientist

Places
Loth, Orkney, a place in Orkney, Scotland

Units of measurement 
 Loth (weight), an historical unit of weight in the Holy Roman Empire

See also
LOTH (disambiguation)